Agnew is an unincorporated community in Lancaster County, Nebraska, United States.

Demographics

History
A post office was established at Agnew in 1886, and remained in operation until it was discontinued in 1978. The community was named for William James Agnew, a railroad official. Agnew was platted in 1889.

References

Unincorporated communities in Lancaster County, Nebraska
Unincorporated communities in Nebraska